Jacek Adam Kacprzak (born 23 December 1970 in Poland) is a Polish retired footballer.

Career

After playing in Greece, Kacprzak signed for Danish side Aarhus Gymnastikforening, but left after six months due to the long ball style of play.

References

External links
 Jacek Kacprzak at 90minut

Polish footballers
Living people
1970 births
Association football midfielders
People from Białobrzegi County
Radomiak Radom players
Legia Warsaw players
Polonia Warsaw players
Athlitiki Enosi Larissa F.C. players
Panetolikos F.C. players
Aarhus Gymnastikforening players
Dyskobolia Grodzisk Wielkopolski players
Górnik Polkowice players
Ceramika Opoczno players
Polish expatriate footballers
Expatriate footballers in Greece
Polish expatriate sportspeople in Greece
Expatriate men's footballers in Denmark
Polish expatriate sportspeople in Denmark